Action Chapel International (ACI) is a Charismatic Christian church based in Accra, Ghana. The church was founded by Nicholas Duncan-Williams in 1979, and since 1992 has met in the "Prayer Cathedral" near Accra airport. It is the headquarters of Christian Action Faith Ministries (CAFM).

Building

Since 1992 Action Chapel International has met in the imposing "Prayer Cathedral" near Accra airport, although the building was not opened officially until 2002 and as of 2003 was still under construction.
The 8,000-seat Prayer Cathedral of Action Chapel International on Spintex Road is the largest church building in Accra.

History

Nicholas Duncan-Williams, a disciple of Benson Idahosa, founded the Christian Action Faith Ministries (CAFM) and the Action Chapel International (ACI) church in 1979.
The CAFM was the first Charismatic church in Ghana. It was followed by the International Central Gospel Church (ICGC) in 1984.
The Christian Action Faith Ministries has its headquarters at Action Chapel International, which is one of Accra's largest mega-churches.

In 1995 there were about 8,000 members of the church.
The church held just one service on Sunday morning in English, with translation into Ewe and French.
The exuberant "praise and worship" part of the service was musical. Choirs and soloists performed, but in most songs the whole congregation participated, with a 10-piece band as backup. A single hymn might last for twenty minutes, with much repetition, creating an exhilarating experience. The music would be followed by the sermon.

By 1998 Duncan-Williams was mainly resident in the US.
Bishop James Saah and pastor Clive Mold were running the church in Ghana.
Duncan-Williams divorced his wife Francisca in March 2001, but later remarried her.
Francisca Duncan-William was active in the church, organizing all the women's activities, and was founder of the Pastors; Wives and Women in Ministry Association.
The couple's personal problems may have affected church attendance.
About 3,000 people were attending the Sunday services in 2003, many of them middle-class professionals and business people.
At this time the church held two services on Sunday, as well as other sessions throughout the week.
This was down from about 6,000 attendees five years earlier.

As of 2015 Duncan Williams was still head of Action Chapel International, and was also chairman of the National Association of Charismatic and Christian Churches (NACCC).
ACI sponsors the Dominion University College in Accra.

References

Sources

Churches in Accra
1979 establishments in Ghana
Christian organizations established in 1979
Charismatic churches
Charismatic denominations
Charismatic and Pentecostal organizations
Charismatic and Pentecostal worship
Pentecostal churches
Pentecostalism in Africa